China Clipper was the first of three Martin M-130 four-engine flying boats.

China Clipper may also refer to:
China Clipper (film), a 1936 movie starring Pat O'Brien
China Clipper (ship), a class of clipper ships
Larry Kwong or China Clipper (1923–2018), first Chinese Canadian to play in the National Hockey League
Norman Kwong or China Clipper (1929–2016), first Chinese Canadian to play in the Canadian Football League
"China Clipper", a song from the 1982 musical Poppy